Daphne is a 2017 British drama film directed by Peter Mackie Burns and written by Nico Mensinga. It stars Emily Beecham, Geraldine James, Nathaniel Martello-White, Osy Ikhile, Sinead Matthews and Stuart McQuarrie. It was released on 29 September 2017 by Altitude Film Entertainment.

Synopsis

Daphne is an attractive, hedonistic 31-year-old woman who lives in London. She is in a shop when a robber threatens, then stabs, the shopkeeper.

Cast  

Emily Beecham as Daphne
Geraldine James as Rita
Nathaniel Martello-White as David
Osy Ikhile as Tom
Sinead Matthews as Billie
Stuart McQuarrie as Adam
Tom Vaughan-Lawlor as Joe
Ryan McParland as Jay 
Ritu Arya as Rachida
Karina Fernandez as Beth 
Timothy Innes as Jimbo
Rania Kurdi as Sofia
Amra Mallassi as Benny
Matthew Pidgeon as Nacho
Ragevan Vasan as Kumar

Release
The film premiered at the International Film Festival Rotterdam on 29 January 2017. The film was released on 29 September 2017 by Altitude Film Entertainment.

Reception
On review aggregator website Rotten Tomatoes, the film holds an approval rating of 100% based on 31 reviews, and an average rating of 7.29/10. The site's consensus reads: "Led by Emily Beecham's note-perfect performance, Daphne is a vivid portrait of a woman in flux - and an auspicious narrative debut for director Peter Mackie Burns".

References

External links
 

2017 films
2017 drama films
British drama films
Films about robbery
Films set in London
2010s English-language films
2010s British films